2014 Regional League Division 2 Bangkok Metropolitan Region is the 6th season of the League competition since its establishment in 2009. It is in the third tier of the Thai football league system.

Changes from Last Season

Team Changes

Promoted Clubs

No club was promoted to the Thai Division 1 League. Last years league champions Paknampho NSRU and runners up Kasetsart University failed to qualify from the 2013 Regional League Division 2 championship pool.

Relocated Clubs

J.W. Rangsit re-located to the Regional League Bangkok Area Division from the Central-East Division 2013.

Thonburi BG United re-located to the Regional League Bangkok Area Division from the Central-West Division 2013.

Nonthaburi moved into the Central-West Division 2014.

Relegated Clubs

Rayong United were relegated from the 2013 Thai Division 1 League

Renamed Clubs

 Assumption Thonburi renamed Assumption United.
 Bangkok Christian College renamed BCC Tero.
 RBAC-BEC Tero Sasana renamed RBAC F.C.
 J.W. Rangsit renamed Rangsit University.
 Thonburi BG United renamed  Rangsit

Withdrawn Clubs

Kasetsart University and Laem Chabang have withdrawn from the 2014 campaign.

Stadium and locations

League table

References

External links
  Thai Division 2 League Bangkok & field Region

Regional League Bangkok Area Division seasons